Melanum laterale is a species of fly in the family Chloropidae, the grass flies. It is found in the  Palearctic. The larva feeds on Poaceae.

References

Chloropinae
Insects described in 1833